Nidau District was one of the 26 administrative districts in the canton of Bern, Switzerland. Its capital was the municipality of Nidau. Although the district is officially German speaking, a small French-speaking minority lives in the area. The district has an area of 113 km2 and consisted of 25 municipalities:

References

Former districts of the canton of Bern